Diplomoceras is a genus of ammonites included in the family Diplomoceratidae. Fossils of species within this genus have been found in the Late Cretaceous sediments (age range: Campanian-Maastrichtian). Studies of Diplomoceras suggest that members of this genus could reach lifespans of over 200 years.

References 

Turrilitoidea
Ammonite genera
Fossil taxa described in 1900